Día Azul (Blue Day) is the debut studio album by Colombian singer-songwriter Jimena Angel, released in 2008 by Universal Music Mexico.  The album was also nominated to a Latin Grammy for "Best Female Pop Vocal Album" in 2009 but lost to Laura Pausini.

Track listing

References

2008 albums